Agustín Oliveros Cano (born 17 August 1998) is a Uruguayan professional footballer who plays as a left-back for Liga MX club Necaxa.

Career statistics

International

References

External links

1998 births
Living people
Association football defenders
Uruguayan footballers
Uruguay international footballers
Uruguay youth international footballers
Uruguayan Primera División players
Racing Club de Montevideo players
Club Nacional de Football players